Nashra Sandhu (born 19 November 1997) is a Pakistani cricketer who plays as a slow left-arm orthodox bowler.

International career
She made her Women's One Day International cricket (WODI) debut against South Africa in the 2017 Women's Cricket World Cup Qualifier on 7 February 2017. In the match against India during the 2017 Women's Cricket World Cup, she took 4 wickets for 26 runs in 10 overs.

She made her Women's T20 International cricket (WT20I) debut for Pakistan Women against New Zealand Women on 9 November 2017.

In October 2018, she was named in Pakistan's squad for the 2018 ICC Women's World Twenty20 tournament in the West Indies. In October 2021, she was named in Pakistan's team for the 2021 Women's Cricket World Cup Qualifier tournament in Zimbabwe. In January 2022, she was named in Pakistan's team for the 2022 Women's Cricket World Cup in New Zealand.

References

External links
 
 

1997 births
Living people
Cricketers from Lahore
Pakistani women cricketers
Pakistan women One Day International cricketers
Pakistan women Twenty20 International cricketers
Abbottabad women cricketers
Saif Sports Saga women cricketers
Omar Associates women cricketers
Higher Education Commission women cricketers
Zarai Taraqiati Bank Limited women cricketers
People from Lahore